Dirk Dries David Damiaan, Viscount Frimout (born 21 March 1941 in Poperinge, Belgium) is an astrophysicist for the European Space Agency. He flew aboard NASA Space Shuttle mission STS-45 as a payload specialist, making him the first Belgian in space.

Education
Elementary School at Poperinge. Secondary School at Koninklijk Technisch Atheneum (K.T.A) at Ghent, Belgium. Received an Engineer's degree in electrical engineering at University of Ghent in 1963; a PhD in applied physics from University of Ghent in 1970; post-doctorate at University of Colorado Laboratory for Atmospheric and Space Physics(ESRO fellow) in 1971–1972.

Career
1965-1978 Belgian Institute for Space Aeronomy. As Head of Section Instrumentation, performed experiments with stratospheric balloons and sounding rockets.
1978-1984 European Space Agency (ESA) as Crew Activities Coordinator and Experiment Coordinator for Spacelab-1.
1984-1989 Microgravity Division of ESTEC, responsible for sounding rocket program, parabolic flights, experiments on EURECA, reflight of Spacelab-1 experiments.

Frimout flew as a payload specialist on STS-45 Atlantis (24 March to 2 April 1992). STS-45 was launched from and returned to land at the Kennedy Space Center, Florida. It was the first Spacelab mission dedicated to NASA's Mission to Planet Earth. During the nine-day flight, the crew aboard Atlantis operated the twelve experiments that constituted the ATLAS-1 (Atmospheric Laboratory for Applications and Science) cargo. ATLAS-1 obtained a vast array of detailed measurements of atmospheric chemical and physical properties, which contributed significantly to improving our understanding of our climate and atmosphere. In addition, this was the first time an artificial beam of electrons was used to stimulate a man-made auroral discharge. At mission conclusion, Frimout had traveled 3.2 million miles in 143 Earth orbits and logged over 214 hours in space.

His flight made him instantaneously very famous in Belgium and triggered what was called Frimout-mania. Prince Philippe of Belgium talked with him when he was in space and a ticker tape parade was organized when he came back to Belgium.

Currently, Frimout is an ESA staff member. He is a senior engineer in the Payload Utilization Department of the Columbus Directorate, responsible for the ESA support to the European experiments on ATLAS-1, and the Microgravity Measurement Assembly to be flown on D2. 

He has authored more than 30 publications relating to Atmospheric Physics Experiments, Crew Training for Spacelab, and Microgravity Experiments.

Personal
He is married and has two children. Hobbies include running, cycling, walking, traveling, and chess.

Awards and honors
1971-72 Postdoctoral Research Fellow from ESRO (European Space Research Organization).
After his spaceflight, Frimout was ennobled and given the title of viscount in the Belgian nobility.

Organizations
Fellow of the Royal Academy for Science and the Arts of Belgium, Class of Technical Sciences, since 2009.
Associate member of the Belgian National Council for Space Research.
Member of K VIV (Royal Association of Flemish Engineers).
Association of Engineers from the University of Ghent.

References

External links
NASA Note about Frimout, May 1992 (archived at Archive.org) 
Spacefacts biography of Dirk Frimout

1941 births
Living people
Belgian astrophysicists
Belgian astronauts
Belgian electrical engineers
Viscounts of Belgium
Ghent University alumni
University of Colorado alumni
People from Poperinge
Members of the Royal Flemish Academy of Belgium for Science and the Arts
20th-century Belgian engineers
21st-century Belgian engineers
Space Shuttle program astronauts
Dutch-speaking astronauts